Ellron Alfred Angin (born 15 July 1958) is a Malaysian politician who has been the State Minister of Rural Development briefly in 2018 and currently the incumbent State Minister of Youth and Sports since 2020. He has served as the Member of Sabah State Legislative Assembly (MLA) for Sook since March 2008. He was formerly a member of the Parti Bersatu Rakyat Sabah (PBRS) which is aligned with the ruling Barisan Nasional (BN) coalition both in federal and state levels and now a member of the Parti Solidariti Tanah Airku (STAR) which is a component party of the Perikatan Nasional secondary ruling coalition in both federal and state levels.

Election results

Honours 
  :
  Commander of the Order of Kinabalu (PGDK) - Datuk (2006)

References

Kadazan-Dusun people
Malaysian politicians
Murut people
Malaysian Roman Catholics
Living people
1958 births